Hill Nunatak is a prominent nunatak rising above the ice at the southeast end of the Neptune Range in the Pensacola Mountains of Antarctica,  east-northeast of Gambacorta Peak. It was discovered and photographed on January 13, 1956, during a U.S. Navy transcontinental plane flight from McMurdo Sound to the Weddell Sea and return, and was named by the Advisory Committee on Antarctic Names for Jack O. Hill, an aerial photographer on this flight.

References

Nunataks of Queen Elizabeth Land